The Dublin and Belfast Inter-city Cup was a soccer competition that ran for eight seasons in Ireland between and including 1941/42-1948/49. Each season's competition consisted of six teams from each of the two jurisdictions on the island of Ireland, the Irish Football Association and the Football Association of Ireland. Played in knock out format, the matches were played on a two leg basis. Dalymount Park, Dublin was used as the home venue by all the League of Ireland clubs. For the second round of the competition, the six first round winners were joined by the two best losers. It was an extremely popular competition, adding variety to the restricted war-time football diet and generated much needed and significant revenues to the competing clubs.

History
1941-42  Dundalk 1-0  Shamrock Rovers 
1942-43  Shamrock Rovers 2-2  Bohemians (on aggregate, Shamrock Rovers won on corners)
1943-44  Glentoran 5-4  Belfast Celtic (on aggregate)
1944-45  Bohemians 3-2  Belfast Celtic (on aggregate)
1945-46  Shamrock Rovers 3-2  Belfast Celtic (on aggregate)
1946-47  Shamrock Rovers 4-1  Drumcondra (on aggregate)
1947-48  Belfast Celtic and  Distillery declared joint winners
1948-49  Shamrock Rovers   3-0  Dundalk

Summary of Finalists

 * Includes shared title.

See also
 Setanta Sports Cup
 Champions Cup (All-Ireland) sponsored by Unite the Union

External links
 Dublin and Belfast Inter-City Cup at the Irish Football Club Project
 All-Ireland Cross-Border Cup Competitions history
 Irish League Archive - Dublin and Belfast Inter-City Cup

Defunct all-Ireland association football cup competitions
1941–42 in Irish association football
1942–43 in Irish association football
1943–44 in Irish association football
1944–45 in Irish association football
1945–46 in Irish association football
1946–47 in Irish association football
1947–48 in Irish association football
1948–49 in Irish association football